The canton of Revel is an administrative division of the Haute-Garonne department, southern France. Its borders were modified at the French canton reorganisation which came into effect in March 2015. Its seat is in Revel.

It consists of the following communes:
 
Albiac
Auriac-sur-Vendinelle
Aurin
Avignonet-Lauragais
Beauteville
Beauville
Bélesta-en-Lauragais
Bourg-Saint-Bernard
Le Cabanial
Cambiac
Caragoudes
Caraman
Cessales
Le Faget
Falga
Folcarde
Francarville
Gardouch
Juzes
Lagarde
Lanta
Loubens-Lauragais
Lux
Mascarville
Mauremont
Maurens
Maureville
Montclar-Lauragais
Montégut-Lauragais
Montesquieu-Lauragais
Montgaillard-Lauragais
Mourvilles-Basses
Mourvilles-Hautes
Nogaret
Prunet
Renneville
Revel
Rieumajou
Roumens
Saint-Félix-Lauragais
Saint-Germier
Saint-Julia
Saint-Pierre-de-Lages
Saint-Rome
Saint-Vincent
La Salvetat-Lauragais
Saussens
Ségreville
Tarabel
Toutens
Trébons-sur-la-Grasse
Vallègue
Vallesvilles
Vaudreuille
Vaux
Vendine
Vieillevigne
Villefranche-de-Lauragais
Villenouvelle

References

Cantons of Haute-Garonne